"Lunar" is a song by French disc jockey and record producer David Guetta in collaboration with Dutch music producer and DJ Afrojack, from Guetta's fifth studio album, Nothing but the Beat. The instrumental track was released digitally on 15 August 2011, as the second of three promotional singles from the album, following the song Titanium.

Track listing

Charts

Release history

References

2011 singles
David Guetta songs
Songs written by David Guetta
Afrojack songs
Songs written by Afrojack
Instrumentals
Song recordings produced by David Guetta